Stayner Richards (December 20, 1885 – May 28, 1953) was a Mormon missionary in the United Kingdom and was a general authority of the Church of Jesus Christ of Latter-day Saints (LDS Church) from 1951 until his death.

Richards was born in Salt Lake City, Utah Territory. He was the brother of Stephen L Richards, who would become an apostle in the LDS Church, and the grandson of Willard Richards, who was also an apostle. From 1908 to 1910, Richards was a missionary for the LDS Church in the United Kingdom.

From 1916 to 1928, Richards was the bishop of the Highland Park Ward of the LDS Church in Salt Lake City. He was a stake president in the church from 1937 to 1949.

From 1949 to 1952, Richards was the president of the British Mission of the church. In October 1951, while he was acting as the mission president, he became an Assistant to the Quorum of the Twelve Apostles. As a mission president he helped select the property for the planned London England Temple. Richards was an Assistant to the Twelve until his death from pancreatitis in Salt Lake City, Utah. He was buried at Salt Lake City Cemetery.

Richards was married to Jane Foote Taylor and was the father of six children. One of their children was the hymn composer G. William Richards.

Notes

References
2005 Deseret News Church Almanac (Salt Lake City, Utah: Deseret News, 2004) p. 74

D. Michael Quinn, “They Served: The Richards Legacy in the Church,” Ensign, January 1980, p. 25

External links
Grampa Bill's G.A. Pages: Stayner Richards

Stayner Richards's diary from at L. Tom Perry Special Collections, Brigham Young University

1885 births
1953 deaths
20th-century Mormon missionaries
American Mormon missionaries in England
American general authorities (LDS Church)
Assistants to the Quorum of the Twelve Apostles
Burials at Salt Lake City Cemetery
Deaths from pancreatitis
Latter Day Saints from Utah
Mission presidents (LDS Church)
People from Salt Lake City
Richards–Young family